Charlotte Amalie West is a town in St. Thomas, U.S. Virgin Islands on the west side of the island, near Cyril E. King Airport. It is the third largest town in the U.S. Virgin Islands (after Charlotte Amalie and Anna's Retreat). As of 2000, the population is 5,146.

Transportation
The Cyril E. King Airport serves Charlotte Amalie West

Climate

References

Populated places in Saint Thomas, U.S. Virgin Islands
Towns in the United States Virgin Islands